Charles J. Hagen was a member of the Wisconsin State Assembly.

Biography
Hagen was born on March 12, 1862, in Lomira (town), Wisconsin. In 1882, he moved to Black Creek (town), Wisconsin. Hagen later moved to Appleton, Wisconsin, in 1910. Pursuits he followed include serving as president of a bank, a manufacturing company and an Evangelical church.

In 1885, Hagen married Louisa Machmiller. They had seven children before her death on August 7, 1899. The following year, Hagen married Mary Mack, with whom he had six more children. Hagen died on February 28, 1947.

Political career
Hagen was elected to the Assembly in 1904 and 1906. He served as a Republican. Other positions he held include village president (similar to mayor) of Black Creek, Wisconsin, town clerk of Black Creek township, member of the Board of Supervisors of Outagamie County, Wisconsin, school board president and justice of the peace.

References

External links
Wisconsin Genealogy Trails

People from Lomira, Wisconsin
Politicians from Appleton, Wisconsin
Republican Party members of the Wisconsin State Assembly
Mayors of places in Wisconsin
City and town clerks
County supervisors in Wisconsin
School board members in Wisconsin
American justices of the peace
American evangelicals
American bank presidents
1862 births
1947 deaths
People from Black Creek, Wisconsin